Naked, published in 1997, is a collection of essays by American humorist David Sedaris. The book details Sedaris’ life, from his unusual upbringing in the suburbs of Raleigh, North Carolina, to his booze-and-drug-ridden college years, to his Kerouacian wandering as a young adult. The book became a best-seller and was acclaimed for its wit, dark humor and irreverent tackling of tragic events, including the death of Sedaris’ mother. Prior to publication, several of the essays were read by the author on the Public Radio International program This American Life.

Naked won the Randy Shilts Award for Gay Non-Fiction from Publishing Triangle in 1998.

Contents

Chipped Beef
About the early life of the Sedaris family and David's hopes to one day be rich and famous. It is revealed that the family is actually middle class.
A Plague of Tics
As a child, David develops nervous tics and obsessive-compulsive habits, like licking light switches and kissing newspapers.
Get Your Ya-Ya's Out!
Ya-Ya, David's mildly senile grandmother, comes to live with the family after suffering an injury.
Next of Kin
David finds a pornographic novel, which circulates among his siblings until their mother confiscates and reads it.
Cyclops
David relates cautionary tales passed down from his relatives.
The Women's Open
David's sister has her first menses while at a golf championship.
True Detective
David's mother and sister are engrossed in detective television shows such as The Fugitive, and David undertakes some amateur detective work.
Dix Hill
David volunteers at the Dorothea Dix Hospital in Raleigh, where the residents' behavior ranges from submissive to violent.
I Like Guys
While at the Ionian Village, a summer camp in Greece, a teenage David realizes that he's gay when he develops a crush on a fellow camper.
The Drama Bug
David attempts acting after being introduced to Shakespeare by an actor's visit to his classroom. David finds that the playwright's florid Elizabethan language appeals to him, and starts to speak with a British accent.
Dinah, the Christmas Whore
Teenage David works at a cafeteria during his Christmas break. He and sister Lisa try to extricate a coworker from a domestic disturbance in the slums of Raleigh, North Carolina.
Planet of the Apes
David begins hitchhiking after he sees the film Planet of the Apes (1968).
The Incomplete Quad
David lives in a dormitory for disabled students at Kent State University. He and a quadriplegic woman hitchhike while posing as newlyweds.
C.O.G.
David gets a job cutting stone into clocks in the shape of Oregon. He teams up with a coworker who describes himself as a "COG" (Child of God), and they try to sell their stones at local craft fairs.
Something for Everyone
David refurbishes an apartment complex owned by a woman named Uta.
Ashes
David's sister marries; their mother, Sharon, is dying of cancer.
Naked
David visits a nudist colony.

References

1997 non-fiction books
Little, Brown and Company books
Works by David Sedaris
American essay collections